Jonathan Yula Okita (born 5 October 1996) is a Congolese professional footballer who plays as a winger for Swiss club Zürich. Born in Germany, he represents the DR Congo national team.

Club career
Okita made his Belgian First Division A debut for Standard Liège on 17 April 2016 in a game against Royal Excel Mouscron.

NEC
On 24 August 2018, Okita signed a four-year contract with Eerste Divisie club NEC Nijmegen. Three days later, he made his debut for the club in the 2–1 away win over Jong FC Utrecht. On 8 September, he scored his first goal for the club in the 3–2 away win against Roda JC Kerkrade. In his first season, he impressed with NEC, scoring 15 goals and providing 13 assists in 41 appearances. 

The following season, Okita struggled with his form, but still managed to score six goals and provide seven assists in 28 games. He was set to leave the club in the summer of 2020, but partly due to the COVID-19 pandemic he stayed at the Nijmegen-based club. 

As new head coach Rogier Meijer took over the reigns, Okita was again utilised in his attacking formation. On 23 May 2021, Okita won promotion to the Eredivisie with NEC by beating NAC Breda 2–1 in the final of the play-offs. Okita, who had once again gone through a mediocre season with four goals and four assists in 33 games, lived up in the play-offs. With four goals in three play-off games, including the matchwinner against NAC, he was a key player in the club's promotion.

On 23 June 2022, Okita signed a three-year contract with Zürich in Switzerland.

International career
Born in Germany, Okita is of Congolese descent. He debuted with the DR Congo national team in a 1–0 2022 FIFA World Cup qualification loss to Madagascar on 10 October 2021.

References

External links
 

Living people
1995 births
Footballers from Cologne
Association football forwards
Citizens of the Democratic Republic of the Congo through descent
Democratic Republic of the Congo footballers
Democratic Republic of the Congo international footballers
German footballers
German sportspeople of Democratic Republic of the Congo descent
Challenger Pro League players
Belgian Pro League players
Eerste Divisie players
Eredivisie players
A.F.C. Tubize players
Standard Liège players
K.S.V. Roeselare players
Royale Union Saint-Gilloise players
MVV Maastricht players
NEC Nijmegen players
FC Zürich players
Democratic Republic of the Congo expatriate footballers
German expatriate footballers
Expatriate footballers in the Netherlands
Democratic Republic of the Congo expatriate sportspeople in the Netherlands
Expatriate footballers in Switzerland
Democratic Republic of the Congo expatriate sportspeople in Switzerland